Arthur Joseph Colgan C.S.C. (born November 8, 1946) is an American priest of the Catholic Church who serves as auxiliary bishop for the Diocese of Chosica Peru.

Biography

Early life
Colgan was born in Dorchester, Boston, Massachusetts and graduated from Boston College High School. He went to Boston College and then graduated from Stonehill College in 1968.

Priesthood
He was ordained to the priesthood for the Congregation of Holy Cross on October 27, 1946.

Episcopal career
He was consecrated a bishop on December 12, 2015, and has served as auxiliary for the Roman Catholic Diocese of Chosica, Peru, since 2015.

Notes

1946 births
Living people
Roman Catholic clergy from Boston
Boston College alumni
Stonehill College alumni
21st-century Roman Catholic bishops in Peru
People from Dorchester, Massachusetts
Catholics from Massachusetts
Congregation of Holy Cross bishops
21st-century American Roman Catholic priests
Roman Catholic bishops of Chosica